BF International Village is a barangay in the first district of Las Piñas, Metro Manila, Philippines.

The barangay has a total 60,000 households, 20,000 families, 50,000 registered voters and 251 precincts.

The barangay is bordered by Gatchalian Village-Barangay Manuyo II to the north; San Antonio V7-Barangay Pulanglupa II to the east; Barangay San Isidro, Parañaque on the west; and J. Aguilar Ave., Barangay Pamplona III to the south.

History 
BF International Village was created by virtue of Presidential Decree No. 1334 which was issued by then President Ferdinand Marcos on April 3, 1978. The third of the three-part division of Barangay Pulang Lupa, it was created primarily to accelerate the pace socio-economic development program by its officials.

Bordered by Gatchalian Village-Barangay Manuyo II to the north; San Antonio V7-Barangay Pulang Lupa II to the east; Barangay San Isidro, Parañaque on the west; and J. Aguilar Ave., Barangay Pamplona III to the south., BF International Village has five official exits and entries namely the J. Aguilar Ave., CAA Rd. coming and leading Alabang-Zapote Road, Pamplona, Las Piñas. The Evacom-Canaynay Rd. is coming and leading to San Dionisio, La Huerta and Baclaran Parañaque, Southland, Talon I and Concha Cruz, Almanza Uno.

BF International Village is now a highly urbanized Barangay. From flooded and muddy streets, 97% of its roads, pathways and alleys are concreted with a good drainage system. Facilities include one Lying-in Center, four Health Centers, four Covered Courts, two Public Elementary School, two Public High School, one Police Community Precinct, four Solid Waste Management Centers, 30 Barangay Volunteer Tanod Outposts, Senior Citizen's Office and Person With Disability office, one Reading Center, 12 Day Care Centers, one Multipurpose Hall and one Barangay Hall Bldg.

As urban development's come from the neighboring barangay and cities, the majority of the residents are among the second class, middle earners, and small-scale entrepreneurs.

Education 
The Southville International School and Colleges located within the barangay.

References

Barangays of Metro Manila
Gated communities in Metro Manila
Las Piñas